The El Hadj Hassan Gouled Aptidon Stadium is a multi-use stadium in Djibouti City, Djibouti. It is currently reserved mostly for football matches. The stadium has a capacity of hosting up to 20,000 fans. The stadium was designed by prolific Malaysian architect, Michael KC Cheah. As of April 2007, the Stade has an artificial turf pitch courtesy of FIFA's Win in Africa development programme. It is currently the home ground of the Djibouti national football team. The stadium is home to many sports federations in Djibouti, including the Djiboutian Football Federation.

History
The stadium opened on June 26, 1993. It is named after the first President of Djibouti, Hassan Gouled Aptidon. The facility was built with the assistance of Chinese engineers. Renovation work at the stadium commenced in 2002. The stadium has also benefited from the Goal program established by FIFA. A new artificial turf was established again in 2007.

Infrastructures
The stadium includes an eight-lane athletic track and a synthetic turf. It has two stands, one covered, which can accommodate 10,000 spectators. The complex also has three rooms for the practice of martial arts and table tennis.

Competitions
It hosts meetings of the Djibouti football team, the Djibouti championship, cups and super cups and athletics competitions. The first official international match played in this stadium opposes Djibouti to the Democratic Republic of Congo during the qualifiers for the 2002 World Cup on April 7, 2000. At the end of this match played in front of 2,700 spectators, the two teams split up on a draw, a goal everywhere. In athletics, it is the place of departure and arrival of the international semi-marathon of Djibouti which takes place each year in March.

References

External links
Photo at worldstadiums.com

Football venues in Djibouti
Athletics (track and field) venues in Djibouti
Buildings and structures in Djibouti (city)
Djibouti